Andrés José Fleurquin Rubio (born 8 February 1975) is a Uruguayan retired footballer who played as a defensive midfielder.

Club career
Born in Montevideo, Fleurquin started playing football with local Defensor Sporting. In 1999 he moved abroad for the first time, joining SK Sturm Graz in Austria and being regularly used by the club during two and a half Bundesliga seasons, with two runner-up league finishes.

In August 2001, Fleurquin signed for Galatasaray SK in Turkey, being a very important first-team unit as the side won another Süper Lig championship. After one year in France with Stade Rennais F.C. he moved to Spain, where he would remain for the following seven years.

Fleurquin started in Segunda División with Córdoba CF. For 2004–05 he continued in that level and Andalusia, but eventually attained La Liga promotion with Cádiz CF, being immediately relegated back with the player appearing in 30 matches and scoring once – on 2 October 2005, in a 1–1 home draw against RC Celta de Vigo.

From 2007 to 2010, Fleurquin obtained one second division promotion with Cádiz, but was also relegated twice from that tier while collecting a combined 33 yellow cards. In July 2010, aged nearly 35, he returned to first club Defensor after 11 years.

International career
Fleurquin earned 11 caps for Uruguay during five years, his debut coming in 1997. He was selected for two Copa América tournaments, being regularly used during the 1999 edition in Paraguay as the national team finished second to Brazil.

Honours

Club
Sturm Graz
Austrian Supercup: 1999

Galatasaray
Süper Lig: 2001–02

Cádiz
Segunda División: 2004–05
Segunda División B: 2008–09

International
Uruguay
Copa América: Runner-up 1999

References

External links

Stats and bio at Cadistas1910 

1975 births
Living people
Uruguayan people of French descent
Footballers from Montevideo
Uruguayan footballers
Association football midfielders
Uruguayan Primera División players
Defensor Sporting players
Austrian Football Bundesliga players
SK Sturm Graz players
Süper Lig players
Galatasaray S.K. footballers
Ligue 1 players
Stade Rennais F.C. players
La Liga players
Segunda División players
Segunda División B players
Córdoba CF players
Cádiz CF players
Uruguay international footballers
1997 Copa América players
1999 Copa América players
Uruguayan expatriate footballers
Expatriate footballers in Austria
Expatriate footballers in Turkey
Expatriate footballers in France
Expatriate footballers in Spain
Uruguayan expatriate sportspeople in Austria
Uruguayan expatriate sportspeople in Spain